Halberg may refer to:

People
 Chuck Halberg (born 1942), American lawyer and politician
 Franz Halberg (1919–2013), American-Romanian scientist and one of the founders of modern chronobiology
 Jonny Halberg (born 1962), Norwegian author and dramatist
 Murray Halberg (born 1933), New Zealand middle-distance runner

Other uses
 Halberg Awards, which recognise New Zealand's top sporting achievements
 Stadion am Halberg, a stadium in Taunusstein, Germany

See also

 Hallberg, a surname
 Halleberg, a mountain in Vänersborg, Västergötland, Sweden
 Hallsberg, Hallsberg Municipality, Örebro, Sweden
 Hallsburg, Texas, city, U.S.